Pedro de Ciancio (born 16 February 1938) is an Argentine former footballer who competed in the 1960 Summer Olympics.

References

External links

1938 births
Living people
Footballers from Buenos Aires
Association football defenders
Argentine footballers
Argentina international footballers
Olympic footballers of Argentina
Footballers at the 1960 Summer Olympics
Racing Club de Avellaneda footballers
Club Almagro players
Pan American Games medalists in football
Pan American Games gold medalists for Argentina
Footballers at the 1959 Pan American Games
Medalists at the 1959 Pan American Games